Boston College is a private Jesuit research university in Chestnut Hill, Massachusetts, that was founded in 1863. The president of Boston College is the head of the university.

Presidents

See also 

 List of Boston College people
 Jesuits in the United States

References

Citations

Sources 

 

 
Boston College
Boston College presidents